The 2023 Rugby Championship will be the eleventh edition of the annual southern hemisphere competition, involving Argentina, Australia, New Zealand and South Africa.

The competition is operated by SANZAAR, a joint venture of the four countries' national unions, and known for sponsorship reasons as The Castle Rugby Championship in South Africa, The Fortinet Rugby Championship in New Zealand, The eToro Rugby Championship in Australia, and The Zurich Rugby Championship in Argentina.

Like in previous Rugby World Cup years, the tournament is reduced, with each nation only playing each other once as part of the Championship.

Table

Fixtures

Round 1

Round 2

Round 3

Squads

Summary

See also
 2023 Rugby World Cup warm-up matches
 2023 Rugby World Cup

Notes

References

2023 in Argentine rugby union
2023 in Australian rugby union
2023 in New Zealand rugby union
2023 in South African rugby union
2023 rugby union tournaments for national teams
July 2023 sports events in Africa
July 2023 sports events in Australia
July 2023 sports events in New Zealand
July 2023 sports events in Argentina
2023